Didone abbandonata is a setting by Leonardo Vinci of the libretto Didone abbandonata by Metastasio first set to music by Domenico Sarro in 1724. It was premiered at the Teatro delle Dame for the 1726 Carnival season in Rome.

Recording
Roberta Mameli (Didone), Carlo Allemano (Enea), Raffaele Pé  (Iarba), Gabriella Costa (Selene), Marta Pluda (Araspe), Giada Frasconi (Osmida), Alessandra Artifoni (harpsichord), Giovanni Bellini (theorbo) Orchestra del Maggio Musicale Fiorentino, Carlo Ipata DVD Teatro Comunale di Firenze Dynamic 2017

References

Italian-language operas
1726 operas
Operas
Operas by Leonardo Vinci
Operas based on the Aeneid